The 2014–15 season was Crystal Palace's second consecutive season back in the Premier League, and was also the first time they had ever been in the Premier League for two seasons in a row. Palace also competed in the League Cup and the FA Cup.

Summary

Management
Crystal Palace began the season under the management of Neil Warnock who returned to the club for his second spell in charge following the departure of Tony Pulis less than 48 hours before the season began. However Warnock's tenure would only last until 27 December when he was sacked from his position as manager, with former Palace player Alan Pardew being appointed as his replacement on 3 January 2015.

Match details

Pre-season and friendlies

Premier League

FA Cup

League Cup

Statistics

Appearances and goals

|-
|colspan="14"|Players who left the club during the season:

|-
|colspan="14"|Players out on loan:

|}

Goalscorers

Disciplinary record

League table

Results summary

Results by matchday

Transfers & loans

Transfer in

Total spending:  £20,650,000  (~ £24,650,000)

Loan in

Transfer out

Total income:  Undisclosed

Loan out

Notes

References

Crystal Palace F.C. seasons
Crystal Palace